Virgibacillus salinus is a Gram-positive moderately halophilic bacterium from the genus of Virgibacillus.

References

Bacillaceae
Bacteria described in 2008